Hord Wilson Hardin (January 3, 1912 – August 5, 1996) was the President of the United States Golf Association (USGA) from 1968 to 1969, then Chairman of the Masters Tournament and the Augusta National Golf Club from 1980 to 1991.

Biography
Hardin was born in 1912 in St. Louis, Missouri and graduated from Washington University in St. Louis.

He worked as a lawyer. Later, he competed in six U.S. Amateurs between 1953 and 1963. He served as President of the USGA from 1968 to 1969, then Chairman of the Masters Tournament and the Augusta National Golf Club from 1980 to 1991. He was instrumental in the relocation of the Bellerive Country Club.

In a post-tournament victory interview at Butler Cabin following the 1985 Masters, Hardin seem to have implied no player really showed the want to win the tournament, to which winner Bernhard Langer disagreed.  Subsequently, when asked by Hardin what his Masters' win will mean to his native country (Germany), Langer answered what the win meant to him personally and completely ignored Hord's question.

He died of a terminal illness in Harbor Springs, Michigan in 1996. He was also club champion Bellerive 22 times.

References

20th-century American lawyers
American male golfers
Amateur golfers
Golf administrators
Golfers from Missouri
Washington University in St. Louis alumni
1912 births
1996 deaths